The Name of This Band Is Talking Heads is a double live album by the American new wave band Talking Heads, released in 1982 by Sire Records. The first LP features the original quartet in recordings from 1977 and 1979, and the second LP features the expanded ten-piece lineup that toured in 1980 and 1981. The album contains live versions of songs that appear on their first four studio albums: Talking Heads: 77, More Songs About Buildings and Food, Fear of Music, and Remain in Light.

Reissues
An expanded version of the record was released on CD in 2004 by Sire/Warner Bros./Rhino, marking the album's first ever CD release in the United States. It duplicated the pattern of the original album, with the first disc featuring the quartet alone and the second disc the ten-member band. Eight additional performances from 1978 and 1979 were added to the first disc, and seven additional tracks from the 1980–81 tour were added to the second disc, with the latter disc featuring a reconfigured running order reflecting the tour's set list from the larger band. However, the introduction to the song "Crosseyed and Painless" was edited out on this CD version.

In 2013, Rhino reissued the vinyl version of the album (on the original Sire label), again without bonus tracks, but with the longer version of "Crosseyed and Painless". The original design of the packaging was also replicated, but the LPs were packaged in plastic sleeves. The album also utilized the original analog mastering for the LP from 1982.

Track listing

Original LP (1982)
Information sourced from original 1982 LP liner notes and 2004 CD reissue liner notes.

CD reissue (2004)

Personnel

Talking Heads
David Byrne – guitar, vocals
Chris Frantz – drums
Tina Weymouth – bass guitar, synthesizer, percussion, backing vocals
Jerry Harrison – guitar, piano, keyboards, synthesizer, backing vocals

Additional musicians
Adrian Belew – guitar, backing vocals
Nona Hendryx – backing vocals on "Life During Wartime", "Take Me to the River", and "The Great Curve"
Busta "Cherry" Jones – additional bass guitar
Dolette McDonald – percussion, backing vocals
Steve Scales – congas, percussion
Bernie Worrell – keyboards, backing vocals

Technical
Talking Heads – producer, mixing assistant
David Hewett – audio engineer
Kooster McAllister – engineer
Rod O'Brien – engineer
Katshuiko Sato – engineer
Brian Eno – assistant engineer
Ed Stasium – mixing engineer
Butch Jones – mixing assistant
Clive Brinkwood – mastering engineer
Greg Calbi – mastering engineer
Jeff Shaw – mastering engineer

Reissue personnel
Gary Stewart – producer
Andy Zax – producer
Dave Artale – mixing engineer
Ken Rasek – mixing engineer
Bob Ludwig – remastering engineer

Charts

References

Albums produced by David Byrne
Albums produced by Jerry Harrison
Talking Heads live albums
1982 live albums
Rhino Records live albums
Sire Records live albums
Albums produced by Chris Frantz
Albums produced by Tina Weymouth